Havana Central (the "Central Railway Station") is the main railway terminal in Havana and the largest railway station in Cuba, is the hub of the rail system in the country. It serves for the arrival and departure of national and divisional commuter trains, and is home to the national railway company, Ferrocarriles Nacionales de Cuba (FFCC), the only intercity passenger rail transport operating in the Caribbean.

The building is considered a National monument for its architectural and historical values and is, along with the stations of Santiago, Camagüey and Santa Clara, a network's divisional headquarter.

Site

The site of the railway station is located where the former Spanish Royal Shipyard of Havana was southeast of the Campo de Marte, and immediately outside the southernmost gate of the city.

Design

The eclectic architecture building has four floors and a mezzanine.  On the main facade, there are two towers on Belgica Avenue representing the Coat of arms of Cuba and Havana, respectively.
The architect was Kenneth MacKenzie Murchison, who was inspired by a decorative style of Spanish planteresque, which is visible in the elements of the decoration of the facade. The station's platforms are nearly one kilometer long and have a total area of 14,000 square meters.

History
By 1910, the 71-year-old Villanueva Railway Station (currently the Capitolio grounds), the first of Havana, had exceeded its capacity due to increasing urban development and population of the city. On July 20, 1910, the Congress of Cuba authorized to build the new railway station on the Arsenal public grounds instead of the Villanueva Station private grounds. The value of the old arsenal grounds and buildings was about US$3.7 million at the time, while the Villanueva grounds were about $2.3 million. This transaction caused heated debates within the political community and in general throughout the population of the city, because the value of Arsenal land was more than a million dollars to Villanueva, so it was unknown where that amount would go.  This resulted in heated debates in the Congress. The Chamber representative Silverio Sánchez Figueras, commander of the liberation army, denounced the trade as a "dirty business", and the action was contradicted by congressman Colonel Severo Moleón Guerra. The confrontation culminated in a duel to death on December 9, 1910, where Congressman Moleón died. Two years later, on November 30, 1912, the new Central Railway Station was opened on the former arsenal grounds.

In June 2015, the station closed for a three year rebuild including additional platforms. All passenger traffic moved to the adjacent Coubre yard, where a former bus terminal was converted into a temporary station.

Service

Overview
Central Railway Station has a network of suburban, interurban and long-distance rail lines. The railways are nationalised and run by the FFCC (Ferrocarriles de Cuba – Railways of Cuba). Rail service connects the Central Rail Station to various Cuban provinces. In 2009, the annual passenger volume was roughly 7.5 million, almost 400,000 less from the previous year, and 3.5 million less than 2004, mainly after the government upgraded ASTRO's long-distance inter-city buses fleet with brand new air conditioned Yutong buses. In 2000 the Union de Ferrocarriles de Cuba bought French first class airconditioned coaches.

Fast trains line 1 and 2, between (Central Station) and Santiago de Cuba, use comfortable stainless-steel air-conditioned coaches bought from French Railways and now known as  the "Tren Francés" (the French train). It runs daily at peak periods of the year (Summer season, Christmas & Easter), and on every second day at other times of the year. These coaches were originally used on the premier Trans Europ Express service between Paris, Brussels and Amsterdam before being replaced with high speed Thalys trains. They were shipped to the Cuban Railways System in 2001. It offers two classes of seating, basic leatherette "especial" and quite luxurious "primera especial".

Route diagrams

Gallery

See also 

Camagüey railway station
Havana Suburban Railway
National Railways of Cuba (FFCC)
Santa Clara railway station
Santiago de Cuba railway station

References

External links 

 Havana Central railway station on EcuRed

Transport in Havana
Central Station
Railway stations in Cuba
Railway stations in Cuba opened in 1912
Tourist attractions in Havana
1912 establishments in Cuba